James Frederick Frye (born 2 February 1956) is a Scottish former footballer who played as a striker for several clubs in the Scottish Football League.

Career
Frye began his professional career with Kilmarnock but made no senior appearances and joined Queen of the South in 1975. Featuring only four times, Frye left after a season to join Stranraer, where he became the club's highest season goalscorer in his two years there. A move to Premier Division side Dundee United followed, but Frye dropped back to lower league football within a year, joining Ayr United.

Frye made over 130 league appearances for Ayr and went on to make nearly 100 for Clyde, where he scored nearly fifty goals. Single-season spells played out Frye's career in the late 1980s, with time at Airdrieonians, and returns to Queen of the South and Stranraer. Frye went back briefly to Queen of the South in the early 1990s, playing once and serving as player-manager.
Played 1 game for Campbeltown Pupils AFC and scored 32 goals becoming their top goal scorer. Frye's grandson, Finlay Rodger is also one of Scotland's hottest prospect footballers who plays for the Morton Reserve Team at the age of 18.

Frye spent three years managing Annan Athletic in the mid-1990s and was assistant to Rowan Alexander at Gretna until 2004. He was appointed manager of Ardrossan Winton Rovers in June 2005, leading the club to the Ayrshire League title in 2010–11.

In December 2011, Frye left Winton to become co-manager with former Ayr teammate Jimmy Lindsay at Kirkintilloch Rob Roy. It was announced in March 2013 that Frye would return to Winton as manager at the end of the season, but he resigned in April 2014.

Frye's most recent managed Saltcoats Victoria from November 2014 until February 2017.

References

External links 
 

1956 births
Living people
Footballers from Irvine, North Ayrshire
Scottish footballers
Scottish football managers
Scottish Football League players
Scottish Junior Football Association players
Kilmarnock F.C. players
Queen of the South F.C. players
Stranraer F.C. players
Dundee United F.C. players
Ayr United F.C. players
Clyde F.C. players
Airdrieonians F.C. (1878) players
Annan Athletic F.C. managers
Queen of the South F.C. managers
Scottish Football League managers
Darvel F.C. players
Ardrossan Winton Rovers F.C. players
Association football forwards
Tarff Rovers F.C. managers
Ardrossan Winton Rovers F.C. managers
Kirkintilloch Rob Roy F.C. managers
Saltcoats Victoria F.C. managers